The 2022–23 Tour de Ski was the 17th edition of the Tour de Ski and part of the 2022–23 FIS Cross-Country World Cup. The World Cup stage event began in Val Müstair, Switzerland on 31 December 2022 and concluded with the Final Climb stage in Val di Fiemme, Italy, on 8 January 2023. The tour started in Val Müstair for the third time. Johannes Høsflot Klæbo from Norway and Natalya Nepryayeva from Russia were the winners of previous edition. Nepryayeva couldn't defend her title, because of the decision of FIS council, after Russia and Belarus were suspended for this World cup season due to Russian invasion of Ukraine.

Schedule

Overall leadership 
Two main individual classifications are contested in the 2022–23 Tour de Ski, as well as a team competition. The most important is the overall standings, calculated by adding each skier's finishing times on each stage. Time bonuses (time subtracted) are awarded at both sprint stages and at intermediate points during mass start stage 6. In the sprint stages, the winners are awarded 60 bonus seconds, while on mass start stage 6, the first ten skiers past the intermediate point receive from 15 seconds to 1 seconds. The skier with the lowest cumulative time is the overall winner of the Tour de Ski. For the fourth time in Tour history, the skier leading the overall standings will wear a yellow bib.

The second competition will be the points standings, which replaced the sprint competition from past editions. The skiers who will receive the highest number of points during the Tour will win the points standings. The points available for each stage finish are determined by the stage's type. The leader will be identified by a red bib.

The final competition will be a team competition. This is calculated using the finishing times of the best two skiers of both genders per team on each stage; the leading team is the team with the lowest cumulative time.

Final standings

Overall standings

Points standings

Team standings

Stages

Stage 1
31 December 2022, Val Müstair, Switzerland
 Bonus seconds to the 30 skiers that qualifies for the quarter-finals, distributed as following:
 Final: 60–54–48–46–44–42
 Semi-final: 32–30–28–26–24–22
 Quarter-final: 10–10–10–8–8–8–8–8–6–6–6–6–6–4–4–4–4–4

Stage 2
1 January 2023, Val Müstair, Switzerland
No bonus seconds are awarded on this stage.

Stage 3
3 January 2023, Oberstdorf, Germany
No bonus seconds are awarded on this stage.

Stage 4
4 January 2023, Oberstdorf, Germany
Pursuit start lists are based only on Stage 3 results. In fact, stage 4 finish differences are cumulative results of stages 3 and 4.
No bonus seconds are awarded on this stage.

Stage 5
6 January 2023, Val di Fiemme, Italy
 Bonus seconds to the 30 skiers that qualifies for the quarter-finals, distributed as following:
 Final: 60–54–48–46–44–42
 Semi-final: 32–30–28–26–24–22
 Quarter-final: 10–10–10–8–8–8–8–8–6–6–6–6–6–4–4–4–4–4

Stage 6
7 January 2023, Val di Fiemme, Italy

Stage 6 bonus seconds
 Men: 1 intermediate sprint, bonus seconds to the 10 first skiers (15–12–10–8–6–5–4–3–2–1) past the intermediate point.
 Women: 1 intermediate sprint, bonus seconds to the 10 first skiers (15–12–10–8–6–5–4–3–2–1) past the intermediate point.
 No bonus seconds are awarded at the finish

Stage 7
8 January 2023, Val di Fiemme, Italy

No bonus seconds are awarded on this stage.

World Cup points distribution 
The table shows the number of 2022–23 FIS Cross-Country World Cup points to win in the 2022–23 Tour de Ski for men and women.

References

Sources

 
 

2022–23 FIS Cross-Country World Cup
2022 23
2022 in Swiss sport
2022 in cross-country skiing
December 2022 sports events in Switzerland
2023 in Swiss sport
2023 in Italian sport
2023 in German sport
2023 in cross-country skiing
January 2023 sports events in Switzerland
January 2023 sports events in Germany
January 2023 sports events in Italy